A Film for XX (stylized as A Film for ××) is the first video album by Japanese musician Ayumi Hamasaki.  It was released on September 15, 1999, on 
x
9

. It sold 38,000 copies and charted on the Oricon video charts.

Track listing

Ayumi Hamasaki video albums
1999 video albums
Music video compilation albums
1999 compilation albums